TYC 9486-927-1 (also known as 2MASS J21252752-8138278) is the primary of a possible trinary star system located at a distance of 26.7  parsecs from Earth in the southern direction in the constellation of Octans. It is a BY Draconis variable, with large starspots causing it to change brightness as it rotates every 13 hours.

TYC 9486-927-1 has rapid rotation and coronal and chromospheric activity suggestive of a young age. Observations and multi-epoch radial velocity data suggest that TYC 9486-927-1 is a single, rapidly rotating star rather than a spectroscopic or tight visual binary. However, it is still possible that TYC 9486-927-1 is an equal mass binary with a face-on orbit and close separation.

The candidate secondary stellar companion is 2MASS J21121598–8128452. It is a red dwarf star of spectral class M5.5. Its projected separation from the primary would be 62,700 AU. The candidate tertiary companion is 2MASS J21192028–8145446 - of spectral class M6 or M7 and at a projected separation of 31,000 AU from the primary.

Planetary system
With a mass from 11.6 to 15 Jupiter masses, it is considered to be either a brown dwarf, or a giant planet.

References

Octans
J21252752-8138278
Planetary systems with one confirmed planet
M-type main-sequence stars
3
Octantis, FT